The 2021 Salinas Challenger II was a professional tennis tournament played on green hard courts. It was the 21st edition of the tournament which was part of the 2021 ATP Challenger Tour. It took place in Salinas, Ecuador between 26 April and 2 May 2021.

Singles main-draw entrants

Seeds

 1 Rankings as of 19 April 2021.

Other entrants
The following players received wildcards into the singles main draw:
  Diego Hidalgo
  Antonio Cayetano March
  Roberto Quiroz

The following players received entry into the singles main draw as special exempts:
  Nicolás Jarry
  Nicolás Mejía

The following players received entry from the qualifying draw:
  Hernán Casanova
  Facundo Díaz Acosta
  Gonzalo Villanueva
  Tak Khunn Wang

Champions

Singles

 Emilio Gómez def.  Nicolás Jarry 4–6, 7–6(8–6), 6–4.

Doubles

  Nicolás Barrientos /  Sergio Galdós def.  Antonio Cayetano March /  Thiago Agustín Tirante Walkover.

References

2021 ATP Challenger Tour
2021 in Ecuadorian sport
April 2021 sports events in South America
May 2021 sports events in South America